Joshua Michael Stern is an American film director and screenwriter. He has directed three feature films: Neverwas (2005), Swing Vote (2008) and the 2013 biographical film Jobs, based on the life of Steve Jobs. He also created the political comedy television series Graves (2016–2017).

Filmography

References

External links

1961 births
Living people
American film directors
American male screenwriters